Feda is a village in Kvinesdal municipality in Agder county, Norway.

The European route E39 highway passes through the village. Feda is home to the static inverter plant of HVDC NorNed. The station was built close to an existing electrical substation. Feda Church is located in the village, serving the southern part of the Kvinesdal municipality.

From 1900 to 1963 Feda was the administrative centre of Feda municipality.

Name
The municipality (originally the parish) is named after the old "Fede" farm. The name of the farm comes from the  river Fedaelva which flows into the Fedafjorden near the farm.

Notable people

Media gallery

References

External links
Weather information for Feda 

Villages in Agder
Kvinesdal